Monday Night, Recorded Live at the Village Vanguard is a 1968 big band jazz album recorded at the Village Vanguard  in New York City by The Thad Jones/Mel Lewis Orchestra and released on the Solid State Records. All tracks are included on Mosaic's limited edition boxed set, The Complete Solid State Recordings of the Thad Jones/Mel Lewis Orchestra.

Track listing
LP side A:
 "Mornin' Reverend"
 "Kids Are Pretty People"
 "St. Louis Blues"
LP side B:
 "The Waltz You 'Swang' For Me"
 "Say It Softly"
 "The Second Race"

Personnel
 Thad Jones – flugelhorn
 Mel Lewis – drums
 Roland Hanna – piano
 Richard Davis – bass
 Jerome Richardson – alto saxophone, soprano saxophone
 Jerry Dodgion – alto saxophone
 Seldon Powell – tenor saxophone
 Eddie Daniels – tenor saxophone
 Pepper Adams – baritone saxophone
 Richard Williams – trumpet
 Snooky Young – trumpet
 Danny Moore – trumpet
 Jimmy Nottingham – trumpet
 Jimmy Knepper – trombone
 Garnett Brown – trombone
 Jimmy Cleveland – trombone
 Cliff Heather – trombone

References

 Solid State SS-18048

External links
 Monday Night at discogs.com

1968 live albums
The Thad Jones/Mel Lewis Orchestra live albums
Solid State Records (jazz label) live albums
Albums recorded at the Village Vanguard